"The Lodgers" also known by the full title "The Lodgers (Or She Was Only a Shopkeeper's Daughter)" is a song by the English band the Style Council, which was their eleventh single to be released. It was composed by lead singer Paul Weller and keyboardist Mick Talbot, and was released in 1985. It is the third single from the band's second album, Our Favourite Shop (1985). Our Favourite Shop was renamed Internationalists in the United States.

Compilation appearances
As well as the song's single release, it has featured on various compilation albums released by the Style Council. The song was included on The Singular Adventures of The Style Council, The Complete Adventures of The Style Council, and Greatest Hits.

Track listing
 12" Single (TSCX 10, 883 351 1)
"The Lodgers" (Extended Mix) - 4:56
"The Big Boss Groove" (Live) - 4:10
"Move on Up" (Live) - 2:35
"You're the Best Thing" (Live) - 4:58
Money-Go-Round-Medley (Live): "Money-Go-Round"/"Soul Deep"/"Strength of Your Nature" - 6:31

 7" Singles (TSC 10)
"The Lodgers" - 3:34
"The Big Boss Groove - Live" - 4:10
"You're the Best Thing" - 4:58

Charts

References

1985 singles
The Style Council songs
Songs written by Paul Weller
1985 songs
Polydor Records singles